Major General Paul David McLachlan,  is a retired senior Australian Army officer. He commanded the 1st Division from November 2015 to December 2018.

Military career
McLachlan joined in the Australian Army in 1982 and graduated from the Royal Military College, Duntroon in 1985. He served with 1st Field Regiment and 8th/12th Medium Regiment of the Royal Australian Artillery. After a range of staff appointments, McLachlan returned to 8th/12th Medium Regiment as its commander in 2003–2004, then moved to J3 (Operations Officer) in Headquarters 1st Division/Deployable Joint Force Headquarters. He served as J3 in Joint Task Force 633 in Baghdad from February 2006, then as Chief of Staff in Headquarters 1st Division. He commanded the 7th Brigade from February 2010. From January 2013, McLachlan became Head of Land Systems in the Defence Materiel Organisation.

Honours and awards
 2012 Australia Day Honours: Conspicuous Service Cross for outstanding achievement as the Commander Joint Task Force 637 on Operation Queensland Flood Assist in January and February 2011.
 2013 Australia Day Honours: Member of the Order of Australia (AM) in the Military Division for exceptional service to the Australian Defence Force as the Director General Development and Plans-Army, and as the Commander of the 7th Brigade.
 2018 Queen's Birthday Honours: Officer of the Order of Australia (AO) in the Military Division for distinguished service in the appointments of Head Land Systems Division, Commander of the 1st Division and significant contributions to Army strategic command and control capabilities within the Australian Defence Force.

Personal life
McLachlan is married to Anita, and has two children.

References

Australian generals
Australian military personnel of the Iraq War
Deakin University alumni
Living people
Officers of the Order of Australia
Queensland University of Technology alumni
Recipients of the Conspicuous Service Cross (Australia)
Royal Military College, Duntroon graduates
Year of birth missing (living people)